Francis Nicholas Blundell (16 October 1880 – 28 October 1936) was a British landowner and Conservative politician.

Early life and career

Born in Little Crosby, Lancashire, Blundell's father, Colonel Francis Nicholas Blundell, was a member of a prominent Roman Catholic land-owning family. His mother, Mary née Sweetman of Killiney, County Dublin was an author who wrote a number of novels about country life under the pen name of M. E. Francis.

Blundell was educated at Stonyhurst College, The Oratory School, Birmingham and Merton College, Oxford. He graduated from Oxford with a BA in 1904.

Landowner and farmer
In 1909, on the death of his uncle, he inherited the Crosby Hall Estate. He thus became the owner of large landholdings, and involved himself in developing agriculture in the area. In 1912 he helped found the Lancashire Federation of Rural Friendly Societies to enable farm workers to take advantage of the National Insurance Act 1911. a member of the Lancashire Farmers Association, he served as its president in 1920, and was later to be a representative for the county on the National Farmers Union. He was appointed a justice of the peace and Deputy Lieutenant for Lancashire.

He held a commission in the Lancashire Hussars, serving with the regiment throughout First World War. In 1918 he married Theresa Ward, daughter of Wilfrid Ward, editor of the Dublin Review. The couple had two children.

Politics
Blundell entered politics in 1913, when he was elected to Lancashire County Council, he became a county alderman in 1931, finally retiring from the council in 1935.
In 1922 was chosen by Conservatives to contest the parliamentary constituency of Ormskirk. The seat, held by the Conservatives since its creation in 1885, had been unexpectedly lost to James Bell of the Labour Party in 1918. Blundell was able to regain the seat for the party, and held it when further elections were called in 1923 and 1924. He lost the seat at the 1929 general election to Labour's Samuel Rosbotham, also a major landowner and farmer in the constituency.

Papal honours
Blundell was an active Catholic, and was regarded as one of the church's most influential laymen in the country. He served as chairman of the Catholic Education Council of England and Wales from 1927 until his death. He was appointed a Papal Chamberlain of the Sword and Cape to three popes: Pius X, Benedict XV and Pius XI.

After parliament
Blundell was recognised as an authority on agriculture, and was appointed to a number of state bodies dealing with the matter. He was appointed to the Imperial Economic Committee in 1926, to the Milk Reorganisation Commission in 1932, and to the Eggs and Poultry Reorganisation Commission in 1933. He wrote two books on agriculture: The Agricultural Problem (1928) and A New Policy for Agriculture (1931). In 1935 he presented Sniggery Woods to the town of Crosby to mark the silver jubilee of George V. In 1936 it was announced that a charter of incorporation had been granted to constitute Crosby as a municipal borough in the following year, and Blundell was chosen to be the town's first mayor.

Death
Blundell died suddenly from heart failure in a hotel in Kensington, London in October 1936, aged 56. He was buried in the graveyard of St Mary's Catholic Church, Little Crosby.

References

External links 
 

1880 births
1936 deaths
Conservative Party (UK) MPs for English constituencies
UK MPs 1922–1923
UK MPs 1923–1924
UK MPs 1924–1929
Members of Lancashire County Council
People from Crosby, Merseyside
English Roman Catholics
People educated at Stonyhurst College
People educated at The Oratory School
Alumni of Merton College, Oxford
Lancashire Hussars officers